Philip Gardner Howe III is a United States Navy vice admiral and Navy SEAL. His assignment prior to retirement in 2019 was associate director for military affairs at the Central Intelligence Agency. He previously served as the 55th President of the Naval War College, and was the first SEAL officer to hold this assignment. Prior to that, Howe was the Commander, Special Operations Command Pacific.

Military career
Howe was a commissioned as an Ensign following his graduation from the United States Naval Academy in 1984. He has held many positions within the Naval Special Warfare and Joint Special Operations Command JSOC communities. Howe has commanded Naval Special Warfare Unit 3 in Bahrain, Naval Special Warfare Group 3 in San Diego, and Special Operations Command Pacific. His overseas deployments have been in support of Operations Earnest Will, Provide Promise, Enduring Freedom, and Iraqi Freedom as well as others across Asia and the western Pacific region.

Howe's major joint and staff assignments include current operations officer at Special Operations Command Pacific; chief staff officer, Naval Special Warfare Development Group; assistant chief of staff for Operations, Plans and Policy at Naval Special Warfare Command; director of Legislative Affairs for Special Operations Command; and assistant commanding officer, operations Joint Special Operations Command. Howe most recently served as the Commander, Special Operations Command Pacific from 2013 to 2014.

On 8 July 2014, Howe became the 55th President of the Naval War College. Howe became associate director for military affairs at the Central Intelligence Agency on 4 October 2016. Howe retired to Newport, RI at the end of 2019 and currently serves on the Navy SEAL Foundation board of advisors.

Education
Howe is a 1984 graduate of the United States Naval Academy. He graduated from the Naval Postgraduate School in 1995 with a Master of Arts in national security affairs, and from the National War College in 2002 with a Master of Arts in national security. Howe enrolled as a student at the International Yacht Restoration School of Technology and Trades in Newport, RI for the 2020–2021 academic year.

Awards and decorations

Military awards and badges

Other awards
 Service Member Defense of Freedom Award

References

External links

Living people
People from Florida
United States Naval Academy alumni
United States Navy SEALs personnel
United States Navy admirals
Recipients of the Legion of Merit
Recipients of the Defense Superior Service Medal
1962 births